Levent Devrim (born 26 August 1969) is a Turkish football manager who last managed Manisa Büyüksehir Belediyespor.

Devrim played professional football as midfielder successively for Konyaspor, Kayserispor, Bursaspor and finished his career with Çanakkale Dardanelspor in 2003. He was known "Küçük Levent" (Small Levent) his first spell in Kayserispor between 1993 and 1995, as he was younger than the team's forward, Levent Kurt (Büyük Levent).

References

External links
Levent Devrim at Footballdatabase

1969 births
Living people
Turkish footballers
Turkish football managers
Turkey youth international footballers
Association football midfielders